The Kurd's Heritage Museum (Kurdish: مۆزەخانەی کەلەپووری کورد; Arabic: متحف التراث الكردي), is a history museum located within the heart of Mawlawi Street of the downtown of Sulaymaniyah in the Kurdistan Region of Iraq. The museum is owned by the Revival of Kurd's Heritage Organisation (Kurdish: ڕێکخراوی بوژاندنەوەی کەلەپوری کورد) but administratively, the museum is affiliated with the Sulaymaniyah Directorate of Antiquities and the Sulaymaniyah Museum.

Foundation and History
Erfan Othman (heritage expert) and his friend artist Barzan Qadir started to collect a multitude of traditional Kurdish objects in 2000 with the intention of preserving and protecting such Kurdish relics through self-funding; no funding from any source was given. Their collection started to increase year after year through purchases, donations, and bequeathment. The Regional Government of Iraqi Kurdistan granted them permission and license to establish their organization (the Revival of Kurd's Heritage Organisation). Farah Hotel is the oldest hotel in the city of Sulaymaniyah and lies in the core of the historical Mawlawi Street, and was opened in the early 1920s. The hotel was abandoned during the last 4 decades. The Directorate of Antiquities of Sulaymaniyah purchased the hotel in 2006 and carried out an extensive restoration and renovation plan in 2013. The process was finished in 2015. The upper (or 1st floor) was given to the Revival of Kurd's Heritage Organisation to display its collection by creating a history museum there. The Kurd's Heritage Museum was officially opened on November 14, 2015 (the same day as Sulaymaniyah Foundation Day).

The Museum's Collection
The museum has 1718 registered items that encompass a variety of objects (clothes, jewelry, books, manuscripts, household furniture and utensils, firearms, rugs, etc.) ranging from 50 t0 400 years old. Around 200 only are on display. The rest are in storage. The bulk of the objects came from the city of Sulaymaniyah or its surroundings. One of the unique characteristics of the museum's content is the so-called Jewish Collection. Around 25 objects were owned by Jewish people living in Sulaymaniyah before their immigration to Israel, including 3 rare Torahs and some parts of a Mizrahi Torah. This number does not include a large number of objects made by Jewish craftsmanship.

Opening Hours
The Museum is open from Saturday to Thursday, 9:00 AM to 1:00 PM. Entry is free. The museum was temporarily closed to the public during the COVID-19 crisis in March and April 2020.

Gallery

Notes
 More images about Kurd's Heritage Museum can be found on Wikimedia Commons

References

Museums in Iraq
Sulaymaniyah
Museums established in 2015